"Tom Hark" is an instrumental South African kwela song from the 1950s, believed to have been composed by Jack Lerole.  The song was arranged for penny whistle and first recorded by Elias and His Zig-Zag Jive Flutes—a South African band formed by pennywhistlers Jack and his brother Elias Lerole—and released in 1956. It was later released in the UK  after it was used as a theme on a TV series, and it reached number 2 on the UK chart in 1958.

Recordings artists of various genres have covered the song, and some of them added original lyrics. A version by the Piranhas became a hit in 1980 in the UK, and it has been  adapted into football chants.

Elias and His Zig-Zag Jive Flutes recording
The song was composed by Jack Lerole around 1954, although other people also claimed to have written the song. Jack and Elias Lerole and their band were performing on the street of Johannesburg when EMI South Africa record producer Rupert Bopape (1925–2012) came across them, and offered them a recording contract. They recorded the song in 1956 with their band Elias and His Zig-Zag Jive Flutes on pennywhistles, with a satirical spoken introduction. The song, however, is credited to Bopape; the right to the song is said to have been sold to Bopape by Lerole for 11 guineas, with the other members of the band paid $10 (6 guineas) each for their work. This version was released in 1956. The title, "Tom Hark", is thought to be either a misspelling or deliberate wordplay on "Tomahawk", the original title of the song. Tomahawk was carried by street children such as Jack and Elias Lerole for protection.

The tune was used as theme music for a British TV series in 1958 about diamond smuggling in South Africa, The Killing Stones. It was then released as a single in the UK, and it entered the UK Singles Chart at number 30 on 25 April 1958; on 24 May it reached number 2, and held that position for four weeks. In all, the song was in the UK charts for about 14 weeks.

Elias and His Zig-Zag Jive Flutes was later renamed Alexandra Black Mambazo and they recorded a vocal version of the song..

Early covers
In the UK, Ted Heath and His Music released a cover of the song soon after release of the original in 1958. In 1962, English singer Jimmy Powell released a new version of the song with original lyrics. Jamaican singer-songwriter Millie Small covered Powell's version on her 1964 album My Boy Lollipop. That same year, Mickey Finn and the Blue Men released their own instrumental cover in the UK as a 7-inch single. The next year, Georgie Fame released a different arrangement of the song (with lyrics) on his 1965 album Fame at Last. Whistling Jack Smith whistled his cover on his 1967 album Around the World with Whistling Jack. In 1969, Jamaican band The Dynamites recorded an instrumental reggae version retitled 'John Public'. 

In the 1970s, instrumental versions of the song were recorded by Jumbo Sterling's All-Stars for their 1970 album Reggae Party; by Bert Kaempfert & His Orchestra for their 1977 album Safari Swings Again; and, in the UK circa 1979, by Captain Morgan & His Merry Men for a 12-inch reggae single.

The Piranhas version

When Brighton-based punk band the Piranhas covered the song in 1980, they used new lyrics written by their frontman, "Boring" Bob Grover. The song peaked at number 6 on the UK Singles Chart, and was the band's most successful single.

The Piranhas version was used as background music in Chris Evans' TV show TFI Friday.  The Piranhas version has since been adapted by football fans as chants in Great Britain and Ireland.

Charts

Seagulls Ska version

In 2005, the temporary Brighton-based band named Seagulls Ska, made up of Brighton and Hove Albion F.C. fans, released their version titled "Tom Hark (We Want Falmer!)". It is a remake of the 1980 Piranhas hit which came to be used as an anthem at many football grounds. The song was released in January 2005 to highlight the club's plight in building a new stadium at Falmer. On 15 January 2005, it reached number 17 on the UK Singles Chart and remained in the chart for three weeks. The club's stadium at Falmer eventually opened over six years after the single's release, in July 2011.

The lyrics were rewritten by Attila the Stockbroker.

Track listing
 "Tom Hark (We Want Falmer!)" (Bopeape/Baine/Grover)
 "Sussex by the Sea" (Instrumental Version) (Traditional)
 "Sussex by the Sea" (Singalong Version) (Traditional)
 "Roll Up for the Donkey Derby...." (Baine)

Other versions
The South African band Mango Groove released a version of the song on their 1997 album Dance Sum More: All the Hits So Far. Jack Lerole, who co-founded Elias and His Zig-Zag Jive Flutes (the first band to record "Tom Hark"), was also a founding member of Mango Groove. However, he left Mango Groove several years before they recorded their cover of the song.

Other covers of "Tom Hark" can be found in such diverse albums as Freight Train (1993), a live album by British skiffle musician Chas McDevitt; The Dansan Sequence Collection, Volume 2 (1993), a Dixieland cover album by Bryan Smith & His Dixielanders; and Party Crazy (2000), a novelty album by Jive Bunny and the Mastermixers. The song can be heard in Instance Automatics claws Prize Circus and Maxx Grab Evolution.

The song has also been adopted by various groups of football fans, most famously by Manchester United fans who sang it to describe Wayne Rooney as "the white Pele".

References

1956 songs
1956 singles
1980 singles
Football songs and chants
Pop instrumentals
South African songs
1950s instrumentals
Columbia Records singles
Sire Records singles